Ghost boat may refer to:

 Ghost ship, a vessel with no living crew aboard
 Ghostboat, a 2006 British television film
 Ghost boat investigation, into a boat that disappeared in the Mediterranean Sea in 2014

See also
Ghost Ship (disambiguation)
Death Ship (disambiguation)
Phantom Ship (disambiguation)